The Mission Railway Bridge is a Canadian Pacific Railway bridge spanning the Fraser River between Mission, and Abbotsford, British Columbia, Canada.

Replacing an earlier bridge built in 1891, which was the first and only bridge crossing of the Fraser below Siska in the Fraser Canyon until the construction of the New Westminster rail bridge in 1904, it was constructed in 1909 by the Canadian Pacific Railway (CPR).  The Mission Railway Bridge is supported by 13 concrete piers and is approximately 533 metres in length.  Before completion of the Mission highway bridge, highway traffic to and from Matsqui and Abbotsford with Mission used the bridge as a one-way alternating route, with traffic lights at either end to control direction.  Rail traffic often held up car crossings, causing long and often very lengthy waits, which were a part of daily life in the Central Valley until the new bridge was completed.  

Beneath the bridge's north abutment is an important river-level gauge monitored during the annual Fraser freshet.  The bridge is also the location of the end of the Fraser's tidal bore - downstream from the bridge the river is increasingly influenced by tidal influences from the Georgia Strait.

Swing span
The Mission Railway Bridge has a swing span which has a vertical clearance of 4.9 metres above the water when closed.  The swing span is fitted atop a circular concrete pier, the 10th from the north bank of the river.  The 10th pier is protected from shipping traffic by two 46 metre wood piers extending upstream and downstream respectively perpendicular to the bridge which are tapered at both ends.  The navigation channel past the bridge is 30 metres in width.  At night a fixed white light is displayed on piers 9 and 11 as well as at the up-river and down-river ends of the protection pier.

The majority of marine traffic consists of log tows and gravel barges, which are permitted to use the navigation channel beneath the fixed span between piers 5 and 6.  The swing span is used for wood chip barges and other vessels which cannot navigate beneath the span between piers 5 and 6.

CPR maintains a bridge tender 24 hours per day at an office on the north bank of the bridge.  Vessels requesting passage through the swing span contact the bridge tender on marine VHF radio, whereby the tender walks the bridge to a control booth situated on the swing span.

See also
 List of crossings of the Fraser River
 List of bridges in Canada
 List of road-rail bridges

References

Railway bridges in British Columbia
Canadian Pacific Railway bridges in Canada
Bridges over the Fraser River
Bridges completed in 1909
Swing bridges in Canada